Daniel Graham (born 1978) is an American football player.

Daniel Graham may also refer to:

Bob Graham (born 1936), Daniel Robert Graham, American politician
Daniel O. Graham (1926–1995), American general and political activist
Danny Graham (footballer) (born 1985), English footballer
Danny Graham (Halifax, Nova Scotia politician), Canadian politician from Nova Scotia
Danny Graham (Cape Breton politician) (born 1950), former Member of the Legislative Assembly of Nova Scotia, Canada
Dan Graham (1942–2022), New York conceptual artist
Dan Graham (baseball) (born 1954), Major League Baseball catcher
Daniel Graham (apothecary) (c. 1695–1778), apothecary to King George II, King George III and Chelsea College Hospital
Daniel McBride Graham (died 1888), Free Will Baptist pastor, abolitionist, writer and inventor